Popești is a commune in Bihor County, Crișana, Romania. One of the largest communes in the county, it is composed of seven villages: Bistra (Sebesújfalu), Budoi (Bodonos), Cuzap (Középes), Popești, Varviz (Várvíz), Vărzari (Füves), and Voivozi (Almaszeg).

References

Communes in Bihor County
Localities in Crișana